The green flash and green ray are meteorological optical phenomena that sometimes occur transiently around the moment of sunset or sunrise. When the conditions are right, a distinct green spot is briefly visible above the Sun's upper limb; the green appearance usually lasts for no more than two seconds. Rarely, the green flash can resemble a green ray shooting up from the sunset or sunrise point.

Green flashes occur because the Earth's atmosphere can cause the light from the Sun to separate, or refract, into different colors. Green flashes are a group of similar phenomena that stem from slightly different causes, and therefore, some types of green flashes are more common than others.

Observing 

Green flashes may be observed from any altitude. They usually are seen at an unobstructed horizon, such as over the ocean, but are possible over cloud tops and mountain tops as well. They may occur at any latitude, although at the equator, the flash rarely lasts longer than a second.

The green flash also may be observed in association with the Moon and bright planets at the horizon, including Venus and Jupiter. With an unrestricted view of the horizon, green flashes are regularly seen by airline pilots, particularly when flying westwards as the sunset is slowed. If the atmosphere is layered, the green flash may appear as a series of flashes.

While observing at the Vatican Observatory in 1960, D.J.K. O'Connell produced the first color photograph of the green flash at sunset.

Explanation

Green flash occurs because the atmosphere causes the light from the Sun to separate, or refract, into different frequencies. Green flashes are enhanced by mirages, which increase refraction. A green flash is more likely to be seen in stable, clear air, when more of the light from the setting sun reaches the observer without being scattered. One might expect to see a blue flash, since blue light is refracted most of all and the blue component of the sun's light is therefore the last to disappear below the horizon, but the blue is preferentially scattered out of the line of sight, and the remaining light ends up appearing green.

With slight magnification, a green rim on the top of the solar disk may be seen on most clear-day sunsets, although the flash or ray effects require a stronger layering of the atmosphere and a mirage, which serves to magnify the green from a fraction of a second to a couple of seconds.

In addition to atmospheric refraction and lensing, another primary cause of the Green Flash may be due to a phenomenon recently discovered by researchers at the Washington University in St. Louis Medical School, which found that when two photons of infrared light collide with a human retina cell, causing what researchers there call "a double hit," it creates the perception of bright neon green. The researchers at Washington U. discovered this inadvertently while working with powerful infrared lasers, which should have been invisible to them, yet the researchers consistently kept seeing bright green flashes from the source of the laser. Because the Green Flash occurs exactly where we would expect the bulk of refracted infrared sunlight (just beyond red but not by much), the most likely hypothesis is that the Green Flash is refracted and magnified infrared light that "double-hits" the retina or camera lens, creating the effect of bright green.

Types

The "green flash" description relates to a group of optical phenomena, some of which are listed below:

The majority of flashes observed are inferior-mirage or mock-mirage effects, with the others constituting only 1% of reports. Some types not listed in the table above, such as the cloud-top flash (seen as the Sun sinks into a coastal fog, or at distant cumulus clouds), are not understood.

Blue flashes

On rare occasion, the amount of blue light is sufficient to be visible as a "blue flash".

Green rim

As an astronomical object sets or rises in relation to the horizon, the light it emits travels through Earth's atmosphere, which works as a prism separating the light into different colors. The color of the upper rim of an astronomical object could go from green to blue to violet depending on the decrease in concentration of pollutants as they spread throughout an increasing volume of atmosphere. The lower rim of an astronomical object is always red.A green rim is very thin and is difficult or impossible to see with the naked eye. In usual conditions, a green rim of an astronomical object gets fainter when an astronomical object is very low above the horizon because of atmospheric reddening, but sometimes the conditions are right to see a green rim just above the horizon.

The following quote describes what was probably the longest observation of a green rim, which at times could have been a green flash. It was seen on and off for 35 minutes by members of the Richard Evelyn Byrd party from the Antarctic Little America exploration base in 1934:

For the explorers to have seen a green rim on and off for 35 minutes, there must have been some mirage effect present.

A green rim is present at every sunset, but it is too thin to be seen with the naked eye. Often a green rim changes to a green flash and back again during the same sunset. The best time to observe a green rim is about 10 minutes before sunset. That is too early to use any magnification like binoculars or a telescope to look directly at the Sun without potential harm to the eyes. (Of course, a magnified image might be projected onto a sheet of paper for safe viewing.) As the Sun gets closer to the horizon, the green rim becomes fainter due to atmospheric reddening. According to the above, it is probably correct to conclude that although a green rim is present during every sunset, a green flash is rarer because of the required mirage.

In popular culture

Jules Verne's 1882 novel The Green Ray helped to popularize the green flash phenomenon. A 1986 French film also called "Le Rayon Vert" or The Green Ray uses the green flash and Verne's book as a plot device. Additionally, the green flash has inspired or been mentioned in:

Jules Verne's 1905 novel The Lighthouse at the End of the World
Mario Castelnuovo-Tedesco composed a 1916 solo piano work titled Il raggio verde, op. 9, depicting a musical/emotional impression of the phenomenon. 
Ernest Hemingway's 1932 novel To Have and Have Not: Boat captain Harry Morgan tells his passengers, "Watch that. When she goes all the way under it'll turn bright green." 
John D. MacDonald's 1962 novel, A Flash of Green employs the green flash as a keynote for the events of the story. In 1984, it was adapted into a film, A Flash of Green, starring Ed Harris and Blair Brown.
Victoria Holt's 1976 novel Pride of the Peacock, which uses both the green flash and an opal named for the phenomenon as plot devices
William S. Burroughs's 1981 novel Cities of the Red Night
Elizabeth Wein's 2012 novel Code Name Verity
The Green Ray, a piece of orchestral music composed by Gavin Bryars and first performed in 1991
Carl Hiaasen's 2005 young adult novel Flush features a green flash throughout the plot
Pirates of the Caribbean: At World's End, a 2007 film that features green flashes as a plot point, as pirate folklore holds that it's a signal that a soul has come back from the dead.
The Lightbringer Series by US fantasy author Brent Weeks mentions the green flash throughout, with characters calling it "Orholam's Wink."
The 2012 television movie Blue Lagoon: The Awakening features a green flash when Emma and Dean are watching the sunset on the island they are stranded on.
Pokémon Sun & Moon Anime "Rising from the Ruins!" Episode 982 - Ash's Rockruff evolves into Lycanroc as the green flash occurs at dusk and reveals a new Lycanroc type up until then unknown (Dusk Form).
Margaret Wise Brown's poem The Secret Song which describes "the first green light of the sun".
Artist Tacita Dean's moving image work 'The Green Ray'

See also

Mirage of astronomical objects

References

Further reading

David Winsta "Atmospheric Refraction and the Last Rays of the Setting Sun", reported at the Manchester Literary & Philosophical Society Meeting, 7 October 1873
Sir Arthur Schuster, Letter to NATURE, 21 February 1915, referring to his observation of the phenomenon on a voyage in the Indian Ocean in 1875
Captain Alfred Carpenter & Captain D. Wilson-Barker, Nature Notes for Ocean Voyagers (London, 1915), reported on page 147

External links

A Green Flash Page, Andrew T. Young's page with comprehensive explanations and simulations
Green Flash – Atmospheric Optics, explanations and image gallery, Les Cowley's Atmospheric Optics site

 06/03/2010 Photograph of a green flash over the Indian Ocean
Green Flash Videos

Atmospheric optical phenomena
Solar phenomena
Sky